The Richmond Whig was a newspaper published in Richmond, Virginia, between 1824 and 1888. 

The paper had a variety of titles, and it is not easy to determine which title was published in which years: Constitutional Whig, Daily Richmond Whig, Daily Richmond Whig and Public Advertiser, Evening Whig, Richmond Daily Whig, Richmond Weekly Whig, Richmond Whig & Commercial Journal, Richmond Whig & Public Advertiser.

The newspaper was anti-secessionist, and was not published during the Civil War, when Virginia seceded and joined the Confederacy. When it resumed publication in April of 1865, after Union troops entered Richmond on April 3, it pointed out that when the war began, the last place in Richmond where "the Star-Spangled Banner" still flew was on the Whig building, and that the Confederate flag never flew over it. When the Union flag had to come down it was replaced with a new Virginia state flag, the Commonwealth's first flag.

In the second issue after republication began, under the signature "Patriot" it published its view of the war:

It also pointed out that it was "The God of Justice works by means, and perhaps there can be no more suggestive instance of his visitation than a corps of colored troops, under the gallant [Godfrey] Weitzel, was the first to plant the flag of freedom over the Rebel Capital."

References

Mass media in Richmond, Virginia
Defunct newspapers published in Virginia
1824 establishments in Virginia
1888 disestablishments in Virginia